Mariakirken may refer to any of four Norwegian churches:

St Mary's Church, Bergen (Mariakirken i Bergen)
St Mary's Church, Oslo (Mariakirken i Oslo)
St Mary's Church, Lillehammer (Mariakirken på Lillehammer)
St Mary's Church, Gran (Mariakirken på Gran)

See also
 St. Mary's Church (disambiguation)